North Peak is an alpine peak just north of Mount Conness in the Sierra Nevada. The summit is to the west of the Hall Natural Area and on the boundary between the Inyo National Forest and Yosemite National Park. North Peak is in Tuolumne County in eastern California in the southwestern United States.

References

Gallery

Mountains of Tuolumne County, California
Mountains of the Sierra Nevada (United States)
Mountains of Northern California

External links